Lim Jung-ho (born April 16, 1990) is a South Korean professional baseball pitcher for the NC Dinos of the KBO League.

References

External links
Career statistics and player information from Korea Baseball Organization

Lim Jung-ho at NC Dinos Baseball Club 

NC Dinos players
KBO League pitchers
South Korean baseball players
Sungkyunkwan University alumni
Baseball players from Seoul
1990 births
Living people